Safdarjung Terminal, New Delhi is a Delhi Transport Corporation's (DTC's) commencing, terminating, and en route terminal. Due to its proximity to Safdarjung's Tomb it is most commonly called the Safdarjung Terminal.

Buses commencing & Terminating

506  Jeer Khure Mandir
509  Maidan Garhi
516  Dera Gaon
517  Aaya Nagar
519  Maandi Gaon
568 Mangolpuri S- Block
569  Sultanpuri - Y Block
578  Najafgarh
628  Uttamnagar Terminal

En route buses
56   New Delhi Rly Station to Vasant Vihar Terminal
66  J.L.Nehru Stadium to Vasant Kunj
89  Tri Nagar Jai Mata Mkt to Sarojini Nagar Depot
512  Ambedkar Nagar Terminal to Sarojini Nagar Depot

Transport in Delhi